Ó Lorcáin (Larkin) was the surname of an Irish brehon family.

Natives of Síol Anmchadha in what is now south-east County Galway, members of the family were ollamhs to the Ó Madadhan. At least one member of the family became a clerk for the Tribes of Galway by c. 1500.

 M1490.15 ... Thomas O'Lorcan, intended Ollav to O'Madden ... died.

External links
 http://www.irishtimes.com/ancestor/surname/index.cfm?fuseaction=Go.&UserID=

References

 The Tribes of Galway, Adrian James Martyn, Galway, 2001.

Surnames
Irish families
Irish Brehon families
Surnames of Irish origin
Irish-language masculine surnames
Families of Irish ancestry